The women's 100 metres at the 2016 IPC Athletics European Championships was held at the Stadio Olimpico Carlo Zecchini in Grosseto from 11–16 June.

Bronze medals were not awarded in the T34, T53 and T54 due to only three competitors being present in each race.

Medalists

See also
List of IPC world records in athletics

References

100 metres
2016 in women's athletics
100 metres at the World Para Athletics European Championships